Morfou Drosidou (born 26 April 1974) is a Greek taekwondo practitioner.

She won a bronze medal in welterweight at the 1991 World Taekwondo Championships, and silver medals at the 1993 World Taekwondo Championships and 1997 World Taekwondo Championships. Her achievements at the European Taekwondo Championships include a gold medal in 1994, a silver medal in 1992, and a bronze medal in 2000.

References

External links

1974 births
Living people
Greek female taekwondo practitioners
European Taekwondo Championships medalists
World Taekwondo Championships medalists
20th-century Greek women